Christopher Linke (born 24 October 1988 in Potsdam) is a German race walker. He competed in the 50 km event at the 2012 Summer Olympics in London, finishing in 24th place.  In the 20 km event at the 2016 Olympics, he finished in 5th place.  He also finished in 5th at the 2017 World Championships in that event. In 2019, he competed in the men's 20 kilometres walk at the 2019 World Athletics Championships held in Doha, Qatar. He finished in 4th place.

Competition record

References

External links 
 
 

1988 births
Living people
Sportspeople from Potsdam
German male racewalkers
Olympic male racewalkers
Olympic athletes of Germany
Athletes (track and field) at the 2012 Summer Olympics
Athletes (track and field) at the 2016 Summer Olympics
Athletes (track and field) at the 2020 Summer Olympics
World Athletics Championships athletes for Germany
German national athletics champions
European Athletics Championships medalists